Miss Diana Marburg, also known as "The Oracle of Maddox Street", is a palmist and female occult detective created by the writers L. T. Meade and Robert Eustace. The character is unusual for Meade, insofar that there is a supernatural element involved in her detective skills, though elements of this are taken from the authors' character John Bell in The Master of Mysteries. Diana Marburg first appeared in the New York edition of Pearson's Magazine in February 1902, in a story entitled 'The Dead Hand'. Two further stories were published, 'Finger Tips' (August 1902) and 'Sir Penn Caryll's Engagement' (December 1902). The stories were published in book form along with seven non-Marburg stories in The Oracle of Maddox Street (Ward, Lock & Co., 1904). 

The Marburg stories have since featured in a number of anthologies.

The author Scott Dickerson has written three further adventures of Miss Marburg, narrated by her brother Rupert, along with versions of the originals, though with changed titles, published in his The Oracular Miss Marburg: Paranormal powers, woman detective--Victorian London! (The YOUNG & SMART Series Book T8). The book is only available as a Kindle edition. One of the new stories features the scientist Sir William Crookes and the bogus medium Florence Cook, both historical characters, and another features Arthur Conan Doyle and Harry Houdini.

References

Literary characters introduced in 1902
Characters in mystery novel series of the 20th century
Fictional occult and psychic detectives
Female characters in literature